Home in Exile is a 2010 Nigerian film that explain how selfish man  can be and how it is inherent to support only what favours one. It is a movie that has won many awards directed by  Lancelot Imasuen.

Home in Exile was released March 19, 2010.

It was premiered at Edo state on 26 September 2010 and in attendance were actors, celebrities, Hon. Patrick Osayime from Edo house assembly and the Chief host was the commissioner of arts and culture, Honorable Abdul Oroh.

Cast 

 Desmond Elliot as Dave
 Beverly Naya as Jullie

Other actors that starred in the movie are Chiwetalu Agu, Francis Duru, Justus Esiri, Cliff, Uncle Jombo and Andrew Osawaru.

Plot 
The king who happened to be Dave's father likes his fiancée Jullie and decided to marry her against tradition, this led to quarrel between father and son.

Award 

 Zuma award for best film on Tourism
 Zuma award for best script

The film also won 6 awards at Terracotta awards, they include:

1. Best director

2. Best Make-up

3. Film of the year

4. Best Cinematographer

5. Best supporting actors

6. And Best custome

References 

2010 films
Nigerian drama films
English-language Nigerian films